Manfred Lorenz (born 26 August 1948) is a German retired football manager. He was manager in the 2. Bundesliga on five occasions and overall seven matches, all for 1. FSV Mainz 05 on short caretaker tenures.

References

1948 births
Living people
German football managers
1. FSV Mainz 05 managers
1. FSV Mainz 05 II managers
2. Bundesliga managers